Heinrich Sievers (20 August 190817 September 1999) was a German musicologist, music critic, university lecturer, and conductor. He was regarded as an authority on the history of music in Hanover and Lower Saxony, and wrote music-historical monographs in English and Finnish publications.

Life 
Sievers was born in the small town of Dorum at the North Sea during the time of the German Empire, but spent his youth in the towns of Goslar and Peine. From 1932, Sievers continued his studies in Cologne, completing his Doctor of Philosophy degree in 1935 at the University of Cologne with his musicological research entitled 'the Latin liturgical Easter plays of the collegiate church of St. Blaise in Brunswick'.

From 1937 Sievers worked in Brunswick as a music critic, and in 1939, the year that the Second World War began, commenced working in Hanover at the conservatory that would become the Hanover University of Music, Drama and Media (HMTMH). Parallel to his work at the conservatory, in 1946 Sievers started working at the precursor of the  within the British Occupation Zone in post-war Germany. He also taught at the 

In 1954 Sievers succeeded the chemist and university lecturer Walter Scheele as conductor of the collegium musicum, the symphony orchestra of the later Leibniz University Hannover (LUH). In 1959 Sievers was appointed professor of musicology at the Lower Saxon College for Music and Theatre, a precursor of HMTMH, where he was also responsible for the department of church music. In the same year he was appointed honorary professor at the Hanover Technical College that would eventually become LUH. In addition, he again worked as a critic in magazines and daily newspapers such as the Hannoversche Allgemeine Zeitung. From 1960 until 1968 he was music director of the Sondershausen Association.

Sievers researched the history of music, especially that of Hanover and Lower Saxony, for almost his entire life. His numerous essays, reviews, books and appearances in radio broadcasts were reflected in several publications. Among his most important publications are The Music in Hanover from 1961, Curious Music from 1970, Chamber Music in Hanover from 1980 and the entry for Hanover in the 1st edition of the encyclopedia Music in History and the Present. His two volumes of the Hanoverian Music History published in 1979 and 1984 are a standard work.

Honours 
 Awarded Grand Cross of Merit of the Order of Merit of Lower Saxony
 Appointed honorary member of 
 Honored with "Fokke-Pollmann-Medal" by "Sängerbund Nordwestdeutschland" in 1984

Writings 
 Die lateinischen liturgischen Osterspiele der Stiftskirche St. Blasien zu Braunschweig. Eine musikwissenschaftliche Untersuchung …. (Veröffentlichungen der Niedersächsischen Musikgeschichte, issue 2, Kallmeyer: Wolfenbüttel), plus Dissertation 1935 at the University of Würzburg, 1936
 Heinrich Sievers, Albert Trapp, Alexander Schum: 250 Jahre Braunschweigisches Staatstheater, 1690–1940. edited by the Braunschweigischen Landesstelle für Heimatforschung und Heimatpflege, Braunschweig: Appelhans, 1941
 Heinrich Sievers (ed.): Bach-Jahr 1950, edited by the Landeshauptstadt Hannover
 Folge 1: November 1949 bis März 1950, Hanover: Osterwald, 1949
 Hannoversche Musikgeschichte. Dokumente, Kritiken und Meinungen. Tutzing: Schneider
 Vol. 1: Von den Anfängen bis zu den Befreiungskriegen, 1979,  and 
 Vol. 2: Vom Ende des 18. Jahrhunderts bis zur Auflösung des Königreichs Hannover, 1984,  and 
 Die Musik in Hannover. Die musikalischen Strömungen in Niedersachsen vom Mittelalter bis zur Gegenwart unter besonderer Berücksichtigung der Musikgeschichte der Landeshauptstadt Hannover., 168 partly illustrated pages with music samples and a phonograph record, published on the occasion of the 325th anniversary of the Opera House Orchestra by the Society of Friends of the Opera House Orchestra, Hanover: Sponholtz, 1961
 Kammermusik in Hannover. Historisches, Gegenwärtiges – Kritiken, Meinungen. Unter besonderer Berücksichtigung des Wirkens der Hannoverschen Kammermusik-Gemeinde 1929–1979, Tutzing: Schneider Verlag, 1980
 Prisma der Musikgeschichte.

as publisher:
 Musik im Weltbild, Book series of the Braunschweigische Staatsmusikschule and the Landesmusikschule Hanover, Hanover: Hahnsche Buchhandlung, 1947
 Das Wienhäuser Liederbuch. 2 volumes in facsimile, Wolfenbüttel: Möseler, 1954
 A. A. H. H. Sievers: "Musica curiosa. Neu eröffnetes musicalisch-historisches Rarietäten Cabinet, worin nicht nur einem würcklichen galant-homme, der eben kein Professions-Verwandter, sondern auch manchem Musico selbst die alleraufrichtigste und deutlichste Vorstellung musicalischer Scharteken, wie sich dieselben vom Schulstaub tüchtig gesäubert, eigentlich und wahrhafftig verhalten, ertheilet, auch ein blühend wohlriechend Würtzgärtlein Historiae Musicae, mit Ehr- und Lehr-, Schertz- und Schmertz-, Leid- und Freuden-Gewächsen, welche zu unterschiedl. Zeiten gepflantzet, nunmehr aber allen vernünfftigen Liebhabern zu sonderbarem Gefallen zu hauffe gesamlet u. in die offenbahre Welt ausgestreuet" (Musica curiosa. Newly opened musical-historical rarities cabinet, in which not only a dignified galant-homme, who is not related to any profession, but also many a Musico himself has the most sincere and clearest idea of musical gangsters, how they behave in a proper and truthful way, cleaned from the school dust, is also told by a blooming, fragrant little spice garden Historiae Musicae, with plants of honour and teaching, of jokes and pain, of suffering and joy, which are too different from each other. Planted at different times, but now to all reasonable lovers to strange favour to be spread out to the open world, 191 partly illustrated pages with examples of music, 2nd, changed and enlarged edition, Tutzing: Schneider, 1971,  and 
 Scurrilia in musica. Ergetzliches aus allerlei Journalen. Tutzing: Schneider, 1988,  and

Literature 
 Günter Katzenberger (ed.): Heinrich Sievers zum 70. Geburtstag. In cooperation with Richard Jakoby.
 Rita Seidel: Catalogus professorum 1831–1981. Festschrift zum 150jährigen Bestehen der Universität Hannover, edited on behalf of the President, University of Hannover, Stuttgart; Berlin; Cologne; Mainz: Kohlhammer, 1981, .
 Helga Fredebold: Ein Rössinger Original, Heinrich Sievers. In Hildesheimer Heimat-Kalender: Kalender für Familie und Haus. Jahrbuch für Kunst und Wissenschaft im Hildesheimer Land, Hildesheim: Gerstenberg, 1998, .
 Werner Sührig: Ostfälisches Platt im Hildesheimer Land. Das Sievers-Kese'sche Gesamtwerk. (Veröffentlichungen des Landschaftsverbandes Hildesheim, vol. 13), Hildesheim [among others]: Olms, 2002,

References

External links 
 

1908 births
1999 deaths
People from Cuxhaven (district)
20th-century German musicologists
German music critics
German conductors (music)
German publishers (people)
Academic staff of the Hochschule für Musik, Theater und Medien Hannover
Academic staff of the University of Hanover